Khaled El Ghandour (born 15 May 1991) is an Egyptian professional footballer who plays as a midfielder for Egyptian Premier League club Al Ittihad.

References

1991 births
Living people
Egyptian footballers
Association football midfielders
Egyptian Premier League players
Beni Ebeid SC players
Ittihad El Shorta SC players
Al Ittihad Alexandria Club players